Tangeh-ye Olya (also Romanized as Tangeh-ye ‘Olyā; also known as Tangeh-ye Bālā) is a village in Binalud Rural District, in the Central District of Nishapur County, Razavi Khorasan Province, Iran. At the 2006 census, its population was 67, in 24 families.

References 

Populated places in Nishapur County